The Rotterdam Session is a studio album by American jazz saxophonist Clifford Jordan recorded together with Philly Joe Jones on drums and James Long on bass in the Netherlands in 1985. This album is a rare Dutch session from the trio and one of the last recordings including Philly Joe Jones before his death in August 1985.

Track listing

Personnel 
Clifford Jordan – tenor saxophone 
Philly Joe Jones – drums 
James Long – bass

References 

Clifford Jordan albums
1985 albums